Gijsbert is a Dutch masculine given name, which is a variant of the names Gisbert and Gilbert, and means "bright pledge". The name may refer to:

Gijsbert Bos (born 1973), Dutch footballer 
Gijsbert Claesz van Campen (1580–1648), Dutch merchant
Gijsbertus Craeyvanger (1810–1895), Dutch painter
Gijsbert Haan (1801–1874), American religious leader
Gijsbert Karel van Hogendorp (1762–1834), Dutch politician
Gijsbert d'Hondecoeter (1604–1653), Dutch painter
Gijsbert de Leve (1926–2009), Dutch mathematician
Gijsbert van Tienhoven (1841–1914), Dutch politician and prime minister
Gijsbert Verhoek (1644–1690), Dutch painter

See also
Gijs

References

Dutch masculine given names